Squamopappus is a genus of Mesoamerican plants in the tribe Heliantheae within the family Asteraceae.

The only known species is  Squamopappus skutchii native to Chiapas and Guatemala.

References

Heliantheae
Monotypic Asteraceae genera
Flora of Chiapas
Flora of Guatemala